Gawler Ranges National Park is a  protected area lying  north-west of Adelaide in the northern Eyre Peninsula of South Australia.  It is known for its spectacular rock formations.

History
The national park originated as the  Paney Station pastoral lease, which was acquired in 2000 by the South Australian Government with assistance from the Australian Government.

Access

Camping is permissible and encouraged at several campgrounds. Although some have toilets, there are minimal other facilities and visitors are encouraged to take adequate food, water, fuel and firewood with them.

Features

Historic sites in the national park include the Old Paney Homestead, the Policemans Point precinct, Stone Dam, and Pondanna Outstation, where agriculture was attempted in the early 20th century.  Notable landmarks are Paney Bluff, Mount Allalone, Mount Sturt, Conical Hill and Scrubby Peak. Other scenic sites are Kolay Mirica Falls, the Organ Pipes and Yandinga Gorge.

Environment
Some 21 rare and endangered animal and plant species including the yellow-footed rock-wallaby can be found in the national park. Another larger mammal is the southern hairy-nosed wombat. Some 140 species of birds have been recorded in the national park.  The area covered by the national park has been identified by BirdLife International as an Important Bird Area (IBA) because it supports populations of the vulnerable malleefowl, the Gawler Ranges subspecies of the short-tailed grasswren, rufous treecreeper, blue-breasted fairy-wren, purple-gaped honeyeater and western yellow robin.

See also
 Protected areas of South Australia
Gawler (disambiguation)

References

External links
Gawler Ranges National Park official webpage  Accessed 17 April 2012.
 Friends of the Gawler Ranges National Park
Gawler Ranges National Park webpage on protected planet

National parks of South Australia
Eyre Peninsula
Protected areas established in 2002
2002 establishments in Australia
Far North (South Australia)
Great Victoria Desert
Gawler bioregion
Eyre Yorke Block